The Naval Cadet Corps, occasionally translated as the Marine Cadet Corps or the Sea Cadet Corps, is an educational establishment for educating naval officers for commissioning in the Russian Navy in Saint Petersburg.

History

The first maritime educational school was established by Peter the Great in Moscow as the School of Navigation and Mathematical Sciences in 1701. The school was moved to St Petersburg in 1713 as the Naval Guard Academy. The school was renamed the Naval Cadet Corps on 17 February 1732 and was the key educational establishment commissioning officers for the Imperial Russian Navy.

Following the destruction of the building in a fire in 1771 the school transferred to Kronstadt until 1796 when the Emperor Paul I ordered a new building in the capital. A new building on the Neva River embankment on Vasilievsky Island was built to house the school - its current location. On 15 December 1852 the school was enlarged and renamed the Naval Gentry Cadet Corps with an intake of 360 students. The school expanded and became the Naval College in 1867 and renamed again to the Naval Cadet Corps in 1891. The Corps was granted an Imperial charter in 1894 and closed after the revolution in 1918.

Post Revolution

The College reopened in 1918 to educate officers for the new Red Navy between 1926 and 1998 the school was named the M.V. Frunze Higher Naval School. The school was merged with the Higher Naval School of Submarine Navigation in 2001 and renamed the Peter the Great Naval Corps - St. Petersburg Naval Institute.

External links
 Page in Russian from Kotlin.ru
 Page in Russian from Ruskadet.ru
 History of the school building in Russian
 History of the Kronshtadt branch
 Cadet Schools in Russia
 Nakhimov Naval School

References

 

Education in Saint Petersburg
Naval academies
Military academies of Russia
History of forestry education
Forestry in Russia
Naval Cadet organisations